Live and Kicking may refer to:

Live & Kicking, a British children's show
Live and Kicking (TV series), a 1999 Australian-rules football variety program
Live and Kicking (Nonpoint album)
Live and Kicking (Eagle-Eye Cherry album)
Live and Kickin', a 2003 album by Willie Nelson
Live 'n' Kickin', a live album by West, Bruce and Laing
Live and Kicking, a 1991 live album by Skrewdriver

See also
Alive and Kicking (disambiguation)